Dream Destinations is a Hindi language adventure tourism television series produced by i-Stylus Productions. The series was aired both on Zee News and Zee TV channel's. Each episode features the host of Dream Destinations going to a different places within India, and exploring the geography and culture of the areas. Besides, the show often goes far beyond popular tourist destinations in order to give viewers a more authentic look at local culture.

Zee TV original programming
Indian television series